Ta'wilat Ahl al-Sunnah or Ta'wilat al-Qur'an, better known as Tafsir al-Maturidi, is a classical Sunni tafsir (Qur'anic exegesis), written by the Hanafi scholar Abu Mansur al-Maturidi (d. 333/944), who was a contemporary of al-Tabari.

Al-Maturidi prefers to combine the traditional and rational sources. Consequently, it can be identified as the exegesis that amalgamates traditional exegesis (Tafsir bi al-Ma'thur — which is interpretation based on tradition or text) with rational exegesis (Tafsir bi al-Ra'y — which is exegesis based on independent opinion).

Al-Maturidi often indicates what the theological or sectarian issues at stake in debates over the meanings of a given verse or passage of scripture. He defended wisely, reasonably and strongly the doctrinal views of Ahl al-Sunnah wa al-Jama'ah on the valid basis available in the Qur'an.

According to a later commentator on this work, 'Alā' al-Din Ahmad b. Muhammad Abu Bakr al-Samarqandi (d. around 540/1145), al-Maturidi did not write the Ta'wilat himself; rather, it is a compilation of his teachings that was prepared by his students. This is possible, as in some parts of the text the line of argument is rather convoluted and repetitious and does not appear to have been composed by a single author.

See also 

 List of tafsir works
 List of Sunni books

References

External links 
 Tafsir al-Maturidi - Altafsir.com 
 Tafsir al-Maturidi on Surat al-Qadr (English translation) — Institute for the Revival of Traditional Islamic Sciences (IRTIS)
 TE’VÎLÂTÜ’l-KUR’ÂN — İslâm Ansiklopedisi 

Maturidi
Hanafi literature
Maturidi literature
Kalam